Gholhak Metro Station is a station of Tehran Metro Line 1. It is located in Shariati Street in Gholhak neighborhood. The neighboring stations are Shariati and Shahid Sadr. It was opened on 19 May 2009.

Facilities
The station has a ticket office, escalators, cash machines, bus routes, pay phones, water fountains, and a lost and found.

References

Tehran Metro stations
Railway stations opened in 2009